Pleiocoryne is a genus of flowering plants belonging to the family Rubiaceae.

Its native range is Western Tropical Africa to Northwestern Angola.

Species:
 Pleiocoryne fernandensis (Hiern) Rauschert

References

Rubiaceae
Rubiaceae genera